Plant is a vegan fine-dining restaurant in Asheville, North Carolina.

History
Plant was opened in 2011 by chef Jason Sellers and investors Leslie Armstrong and Alan Berger. It was Asheville's first all-vegan restaurant.

Reception
In 2019 Thrillist named Plant one of the 22 best vegetarian restaurants in the United States.

In 2018 USA Today named them one of the ten best vegan restaurants in the country, 
 and Insider named them the best vegan restaurant in North Carolina.

In 2017 Tasting Table and The Daily Meal named them one of the best vegan restaurants in the United States.

In 2015 Plant was named one of the top six vegan fine-dining restaurants in the United States by PETA and BuzzFeed named them one of 24 "bucket list" vegan restaurants.

In 2013 Travel + Leisure named them one of the best vegetarian restaurants in the U.S.

Food & Wine named them to a list of the best 19 vegetarian and vegan restaurants in the U.S. Food Network named them one of the top 20 vegan restaurants in the United States.

See also
List of vegetarian restaurants

References

Vegan restaurants in the United States
Fine dining
Vegan cuisine
Restaurants established in 2011
Asheville, North Carolina
Restaurants in North Carolina
2011 establishments in North Carolina